William Barrymore (1759–1830) was a British stage actor. Originally from Taunton he was part of a company of strolling players in the West Country, and was acting at Plymouth in 1780. He first appeared at the Theatre Royal, Drury Lane in 1782, under the management of Richard Sheridan, and became a long-standing member of the company. He is also the namesake of the famed Barrymore family.

Selected roles
 Lord Aimworth in The Maid of the Mill by Isaac Bickerstaffe (1782)
 Osric in Hamlet by William Shakespeare (1783)
 Freeman in The Metamorphosis by William Jackson (1783)
 Connal in The Captives by John Delap (1786)
 Amphares in The Fate of Sparta by Hannah Cowley (1788)
 Alonzo in Marcella by William Hayley (1789)
 Gondibert in The Battle of Hexham by George Colman the Younger (1789)
 Sir Charles Freemantle in The Impostors by Richard Cumberland (1789)
 Mr Fashion in The Welch Heiress by Edward Jerningham (1795)
 Sir Pertinax Pitiful in The Man of Ten Thousand by Thomas Holcroft (1796)
 Annius in The Conspiracy by Robert Jephson (1796)
 Aurelius in Vortigern and Rowena by William Henry Ireland (1796)
Osmond  in The Castle Spectre by Matthew Lewis (1797)
 Oliver in Knave or Not? by Thomas Holcroft (1798)
 Clifton in A Word for Nature by Richard Cumberland (1798)
 Modish in The East Indian by Matthew Lewis (1799)
 Lapont in The Castle of Montval by Thomas Sedgwick Whalley (1799)
 Pizarro in Pizarro by Richard Brinsley Sheridan (1799)
 Count Freberg in De Monfort by Joanna Baillie (1800)
 Don Gusman in Antonio by William Godwin (1800)
 Clermont in Indiscretion by Prince Hoare (1800)
 Father Cyprion in Adelmorn, the Outlaw by Matthew Lewis (1801)
 Sir Harry Lovelace in The Land We Live In by Francis Ludlow Holt (1804)
 Colonel Anson in The Vindictive Man by Thomas Holcroft (1806)
 Hugh de Tracy in The Curfew by John Tobin (1807)

References

Bibliography
 Highfill, Philip H, Burnim, Kalman A. & Langhans, Edward A. A Biographical Dictionary of Actors, Actresses, Musicians, Dancers, Managers, and Other Stage Personnel in London, 1660-1800: Abaco to Belfille. SIU Press, 1973.

18th-century English people
English male stage actors
British male stage actors
18th-century English male actors
18th-century British male actors
19th-century English male actors
19th-century British male actors
1759 births
1830 deaths
People from Taunton